Olsen or Ölsen may refer to:

Olsen (surname), people with the surname Olsen
Fred. Olsen & Co., a large shipping company with worldwide headquarters in Oslo, Norway
Ölsen, municipality in Rhineland-Palatinate, Germany.
Olsen House, a historic house in Helena, Montana, U.S.

See also

Olsen Gang, a fictional Danish criminal gang in the movies of the same name
"Olsen Olsen", a song by post rock band Sigur Rós from their album Ágætis byrjun
Olson (disambiguation)
Olsson
Oulson